Festuca vaginalis is a species of grass. It is found only in Ecuador.

References

vaginalis
Endemic flora of Ecuador
Grasses of South America
Least concern plants
Taxonomy articles created by Polbot